Boy Eating the Bird's Food is a 2012 Greek drama film written and directed by Ektoras Lygizos (in his feature directorial debut), loosely based on the 1890 novel Hunger by Knut Hamsun. It was selected as the Greek entry for the Best Foreign Language Film at the 86th Academy Awards, but it was not nominated.

Synopsis 
During the Greek crisis, a young man is forced to steal food from birds to survive.

Cast
 Yiannis Papadopoulos as boy
  as girl
 Vangelis Kommatas as old man
 Kharálampos Goyós as musician at audition
 Kleopatra Peraki as woman in church
 Konstadinos Voudouris

See also
 List of submissions to the 86th Academy Awards for Best Foreign Language Film
 List of Greek submissions for the Academy Award for Best International Feature Film

References

External links
 

2012 films
2012 directorial debut films
2012 drama films
Films about poverty
Films based on Norwegian novels
Films based on works by Knut Hamsun
Films set in Athens
Films shot in Athens
Greek drama films
2010s Greek-language films